Gangarampur subdivision is an administrative subdivision of the Dakshin Dinajpur district in the Indian state of West Bengal.

Subdivisions
Dakshin Dinajpur district is divided into two administrative subdivisions:

.*2011

Administrative units
Gangarampur subdivision has 4 police stations, 4 community development blocks, 4 panchayat samitis, 30 gram panchayats, 750 mouzas, 730 inhabited villages, 2 municipalities and 2 census towns. The municipalities are at Gangarampur and Buniadpur. The census towns are: Gopalpur and Harirampur. The subdivision has its headquarters at Buniadpur.

Police stations
Police stations in Balurghat subdivision have the following features and jurisdiction:

Blocks
Community development blocks in Balurghat subdivision are:

Gram panchayats
The subdivision contains 30 gram panchayats under 4 community development blocks:

 Gangarampur block consists of 11 gram panchayats, viz. Ashokegram, Belbari–II, Gangarampur, Sukdevpur, Basuria, Chaloon, Jahangirpur, Uday, Belbari–I, Damdama and 4no.Nandanpur.
 Banshihari block consists of 4 gram panchayats, viz. Ellahabad, Ganguria, Brajaballavpur and Mahabari.
 Harirampur block consists of 6 gram panchayats, viz. Bagichapur, Gokarna, Saiyadpur, Bairhatta, Pundari and Shirshi.
 Kushmandi block consists of 8 gram panchayats, viz. Akcha, Deul, Karanji, Maligaon, Beroil, Kalikamora, Kushmandi and Udaypur.

Education
Dakshin Dinajpur district had a literacy rate of 72.82% (for population of 7 years and above) as per the census of India 2011. Balurghat subdivision had a literacy rate of 75.78%, Gangarampur subdivision 69.24%.

Given in the table below (data in numbers) is a comprehensive picture of the education scenario in Dakshin district for the year 2013-14:

Note: Primary schools include junior basic schools; middle schools, high schools and higher secondary schools include madrasahs; technical schools include junior technical schools, junior government polytechnics, industrial technical institutes, industrial training centres, nursing training institutes etc.; technical and professional colleges include engineering colleges, medical colleges, para-medical institutes, management colleges, teachers training and nursing training colleges, law colleges, art colleges, music colleges etc. Special and non-formal education centres include sishu siksha kendras, madhyamik siksha kendras, centres of Rabindra mukta vidyalaya, recognised Sanskrit tols, institutions for the blind and other handicapped persons, Anganwadi centres, reformatory schools etc.

The following institutions are in Gangarampur subdivision:

Gangarampur College was established in 1981 at Gangarampur.

Buniadpur Mahavidyalaya was established at Buniadpur in 2007.

Dewan Abdul Gani College was established at Harirampur in 1994.

Kushmandi Government College was established at Kushmandi in 2015.

Healthcare
The table below (all data in numbers) presents an overview of the medical facilities available and patients treated in the hospitals, health centres and sub-centres in 2014 in Dakshin Dinajpur district.  
 

.* Excluding nursing homes

Medical facilities available in Gangarampur subdivision are as follows:

Hospitals: (Name, location, beds)
Gangarampur subdivisional hospital, Gangarampur, 250 beds
Rural Hospitals: (Name, block, location, beds)
Harirampur Rural Hospital, Harirampur CD Block, Harirampur, 30 beds
Rashidpur Rural Hospital, Bansihari CD Block, Rashidpur, 30 beds
Kushmandi Rural Hospital, Kushmandi CD Block, Kushmandi, Dakshin Dinajpur, 30 beds
Block Primary Health Centre: (Name, location, beds)
Mathurapur (Chalon) BPHC, Gangarampur CD Block, PO Bansagar, 10 beds
Primary Health Centres: (CD Block-wise)(CD Block, PHC location, beds)
Gangarampur CD Block: Sarbamangala (Sarbamangala (Bansuria) PHC) (10)
Harirampur CD Block: Balihara (10)
Bansihari CD Block: Badalpur (10)
Kushmandi CD Block: Sehail (Nanaharpara PHC) (10), Aminpur (10)

Electoral constituencies
Lok Sabha (parliamentary) and Vidhan Sabha (state assembly) constituencies in Gangarampur subdivision were as follows:

References

Subdivisions of West Bengal
Subdivisions in Dakshin Dinajpur district
Dakshin Dinajpur district
Gangarampur